Louis Ferdinand of Prussia may refer to:

Prince Louis Ferdinand of Prussia (1772–1806), post-Frederican soldier, son of Prince Augustus Ferdinand of Prussia, nephew of Frederick II
Louis Ferdinand, Prince of Prussia (1907–1994), son of Crown Prince Wilhelm of Germany, head of the Prussian Royal House